In December 1862, President of the United States Abraham Lincoln sent a brief consoling letter to Fanny McCullough, the daughter of lieutenant colonel William McCullough, following his death in the American Civil War.

Background
Lincoln had met William McCullough years before when Lincoln was a circuit lawyer in Illinois and McCullough was a Circuit Clerk in McLean County. Lincoln would sometimes stay with the McCullough family when he reached the Bloomington, Illinois area of the circuit. McCullough became an ardent supporter of Lincoln beginning with Lincoln's successful run for Congress in 1846. With the start of the Civil War, McCullough petitioned Lincoln to allow him to enlist despite his health problems and age. McCullough's request was granted, and he was commissioned a lieutenant colonel in the 4th Illinois Cavalry. 

After McCullough was killed December 5, 1862 in an engagement near Coffeeville, Mississippi, his daughter Mary Frances ("Fanny") was inconsolable and locked herself in her room. At the request of David Davis, a mutual friend of Lincoln and the McCullough family, Lincoln wrote to Fanny on December 23.

Text

See also

Bixby letter

References

External links
A Common Bond of Grief - Wall Street Journal article
Close Reading - Letter to Fanny McCullough
Lecture by Megan VanGorder on the letter
Lincoln's Bloomington article on Fanny McCullough

Works by Abraham Lincoln
Presidency of Abraham Lincoln
Letters (message)
1862 documents
December 1862 events